is a Japanese senior business executive at Honda Motor Co. (joined in 1978), who has served as the President, Chief Executive Officer and Representative Director of Honda since June 2009. He was appointed to the position of Chief Executive Officer in 2009 and became President of the Board in 2010.

Takanobu Ito has also been an executive of Honda R&D since 1998, appointed as President and Director of Honda R&D Co., Ltd. in April 2009. Previously, he had been appointed Senior Managing Director of Honda R&D in June 2001, after Director of the Company in June 2000, following the position as Executive Vice President of Honda R&D Americas, Inc. since April 1998.

He joined Honda in April 1978.

References

External links
 "Honda's Ito Positions Automaker to Win in Asia" (Nikkei.com, 14 August 2013).

1953 births
Living people
Honda people
Japanese corporate directors